Saint Michael Defeats the Rebel Angels or Fall of the Rebel Angels is an oil on canvas painting by Domenico Beccafumi, executed c. 
1524, now in the Pinacoteca Nazionale di Siena. It was begun for San Niccolò al Carmine, Siena, but left unfinished, with the artist completing another version for the same church in 1526. Vasari's Lives of the Artists mentions the work, stating the artist wished to create "a new invention to show the virtue and good conceits of his soul".

References

Paintings by Domenico Beccafumi
1524 paintings
Paintings in the Pinacoteca Nazionale (Siena)
Paintings depicting Michael (archangel)